Events from the year 1394 in Ireland.

Incumbent
Lord: Richard II

Events
2 October – King Richard II of England leads his first expedition to Ireland to enforce his rule.
25 December – Richard defines the borders of English rule in Ireland; later to become known as the English Pale.
Battle of Ros-Mhic-Thriúin: Art Mór Mac Murchadha Caomhánach, King of Leinster, defeats forces of the Norman Lordship of Ireland.

Births

Deaths
 Thomas le Reve -  the first Bishop of Waterford and Lismore following the unification of the two sees

References